Jason New is a former association football player who represented New Zealand at international level.

New made his full All Whites debut in a 0–2 loss to China on 28 June 1996 and ended his international playing career with six A-international caps to his credit, his final cap an appearance in a 1–1 draw with Lebanon on 9 October 1996.

References 

Year of birth missing (living people)
Living people
New Zealand association footballers
New Zealand international footballers
Association footballers not categorized by position